This table displays the top-rated primetime television series of the 2000–01 season as measured by Nielsen Media Research.

References

2000 in American television
2001 in American television
2000-related lists
2001-related lists
Lists of American television series